The Angry Beavers is an American animated television series created by Mitch Schauer for Nickelodeon. The series revolves around Daggett and Norbert Beaver, two young beaver brothers who have moved out of their parents' home to become bachelors in the forest near the fictional Wayouttatown, Oregon. 

The pilot episode, entitled "Snowbound", was finished in 1994. The series officially premiered in on April 19, 1997, and ended on May 26, 2001, with a total of 62 episodes (123 segments) over the course of 4 seasons. The series has also appeared in syndication on Nickelodeon Canada. The complete series has also been released on DVD in Region 1 by Shout! Factory.

Series overview

Episodes

Pilot (1994)

Mitch Schauer originally created a test pilot episode of The Angry Beavers for Nickelodeon in 1994, entitled "Snowbound." The pilot was later found and uploaded to YouTube on May 26, 2022, by the user "keith gaminggamer".

Season 1 (1997)

Season 2 (1998)

Season 3 (1999–2000)

Season 4 (2000–01)

Unfinished Finale
The episode was never animated due to "Bye Bye Beavers" breaking Nickelodeon's rule against "final episodes" that reference the fact that the show is ending.

References

External links
 

Lists of American children's animated television series episodes
Lists of Nickelodeon television series episodes